The Hebron United States Post Office is a historic building in Hebron, Nebraska. It was built in 1937, and designed in the Moderne style by U.S. supervising architect Louis A. Simon. Inside there is a mural by Eldora Lorenzini, completed in 1939. The building has been listed on the National Register of Historic Places since May 11, 1992, as US Post Office-Hebron.

The mural's subject is a herd of stampeding buffalo, stopping a train.  An event of this type was asserted to have happened in the area.

References

National Register of Historic Places in Thayer County, Nebraska
Moderne architecture in the United States
Government buildings completed in 1937
Post office buildings on the National Register of Historic Places in Nebraska